The University of Pavia (UNIPV or Università di Pavia) is a university located in Pavia, Lombardy, Italy. There was evidence of teaching as early as 1361, making it one of the oldest universities in the world. It was the sole university in Milan and the greater Lombardy region until the end of the 19th century.
In 2022 the university was recognized by the Times Higher Education among the top 10 in Italy and among the 300 best in the world.
Currently, it has 18 departments and 9 faculties. It does not have a main campus; its buildings and facilities are scattered around the city, which is in turn called "a city campus." The university caters to more than 20,000 students who come from Italy and all over the world.

The university offers more than 80 undergraduate programs; over 40 master programs, and roughly 20 doctoral programs (including 8 in English). About 1,500 students who enter the university every year are international students.

The university operates multiple cultural and scientific museums, including the University History Museum, a botanical garden, research centers, university libraries and a university press. The university is also affiliated with Policlinico San Matteo, at which hundreds of medical students from the university perform clinical rotations during their clinical years.

The University of Pavia is a member of the COIMBRA Group and European University Association. It also participates in the Erasmus Programme, which allows student exchanges between the University of Pavia and various universities in Europe.

History

Foundation and the Middle Ages 
An edict issued by the Frankish king of Italy, Lothar I (ruled 818–55) mentions the existence of a higher education institution at Pavia as early as AD 825. This institution, mainly devoted to ecclesiastical and civil law as well as to divinity studies, was then selected as the prime educational centre for northern Italy.

In 1361, the institution was officially established as a studium generale by the Holy Roman emperor Charles IV, who granted the same teaching privileges enjoyed by the University of Paris and Bologna, allowing the institution to teach canon and civil law, philosophy, medicine and liberal arts. It was then expanded and renovated by the duke of Milan, Gian Galeazzo Visconti, becoming the sole university in the Duchy of Milan until the end of the 19th century. Gian Galeazzo worked tirelessly to consolidate the institution and in 1389, he obtained a permission from Pope Boniface IX to teach advanced theology courses.

It was divided into two distinct universities — of jurisprudence (teaching civil and canon law courses) and of arts (teaching medicine, philosophy and liberal arts courses). A rector was elected every year, normally a student who was over twenty years old. The institution offered bachelor, licentiate and doctoral degrees. Despite the politics and hardships due to wars and pestilence, it experienced great growth and the institution was considered to be prestigious as evidenced by the influx of foreign students at the time. In 1412, Filippo Maria Visconti further consolidated the universities, invited prominent scholars to teach there and declared an edict giving serious penalties aimed at preventing students from going elsewhere to study.

Renaissance and Modern Period 
Towards the 15th century, prominent teachers such as Baldo degli Ubaldi, Lorenzo Valla, Giasone del Maino taught students in the fields of law, philosophy and literary studies. In the same years, Elia di Sabato da Fermo, personal doctor of Filippo Maria Visconti, was the first professor of medicine of the Jewish religion at a European university, while from 1490 a teaching of Hebrew was established at the university.
Not many years later, probably in 1511, Leonardo da Vinci studied anatomy together with Marcantonio della Torre, professor of anatomy at the university.
During the ongoing Italian War of 1521-6, the authorities in Pavia were forced to close the university in 1524. However, during the 16th century, after the university was re-opened, scholars and scientists such as Andrea Alciato and Gerolamo Cardano taught here. During the period in which the duchy of Milan was governed by the kings of Spain, the research and educational activities of the university stagnated, but there were still prominent scholars such as Gerolamo Saccheri who was still involved with the university.

The rebirth of the university was, in part, due to the initiatives led by Maria Theresa and Joseph II of the House of Austria, in the second half of the 18th century. The initiatives included massive renovations to the teaching programs, research and structure rehabilitations, which were still retained by the university until now.

Throughout its history, the university had benefited from the presence of many distinguished teachers and scientists who wrote celebrated works and made important discoveries — chemist Luigi Valentino Brugnatelli, mathematician Girolamo Cardano (born in Pavia, 1501–76), physicist Alessandro Volta (chair of natural philosophy 1769–1804), poet Ugo Foscolo (chair of eloquence 1809–10), playwright Vincenzo Monti, jurist Gian Domenico Romagnosi, naturalist Lazzaro Spallanzani, mathematician Lorenzo Mascheroni and anatomist Antonio Scarpa.

In 1858, the university was the scene of intense student protests against Austrian rule in northern Italy (through the kingdom of Lombardy–Venetia). The authorities responded by ordering the university's temporary closure. The incidents at Pavia were typical of the wave of nationalist demonstrations all over Italy that immediately preceded the Unification (1859–66).

During the 19th century, the medical, natural science and mathematics schools were graced by prominent scientists who propelled the status of the university to new heights. Three Nobel Prize winners taught in Pavia — physician Camillo Golgi (at Pavia from 1861), who was awarded the Nobel Prize in Physiology in 1906 for his studies on the structure of the nervous system, chemist Giulio Natta (at Pavia between 1933 and 1935) and physicist Carlo Rubbia. In addition, distinguished mathematicians Eugenio Beltrami, Felice Casorati and Luigi Berzolari were regular teachers in Pavia. It was also in the University of Pavia, in 1912, Carlo Forlanini discovered the first successful cure for tuberculosis — artificial pneumothorax. In the 1960s, the Faculty of Economics and Commerce as well as Engineering were added to the current lineup of faculties.

During the 20th century, teaching and research activities were carried out by additional prominent scholars such as Pasquale Del Giudice and Arrigo Solmi for law history; Contardo Ferrini and Pietro Bonfante for Roman law; Luigi Cossa and Benvenuto Griziotti for economy, Giacinto Romano for medieval and modern history and Plinio Fraccaro for ancient history.

Also critical to the university's reputation was its distinguished record of public education, epitomized by the establishment of private and public colleges. The oldest colleges, the Collegio Borromeo and Collegio Ghislieri, were built in the 16th century, and in more recent times others were founded through both public and private initiatives — the Collegio Nuovo, the Collegio Santa Caterina and the other eleven colleges managed by EDiSU. In 1997 the IUSS, was established, a Higher Learning Institution similar to the Scuola Normale Superiore and Istituto Superiore Sant'Anna in Pisa. The IUSS is the federal body that links the colleges of Pavia which constitute the Pavia University System.

Today, the university continues to offer a wide variety of disciplinary and inter-disciplinary teaching. Research is carried out in departments, institutes, clinics, centres and laboratories, in close association with public and private institutions, enterprises, and factories.

Organization

The university has eighteen departments and nine faculties.

Departments 
 Department of Clinical Surgery, Diagnostics and Pediatrics
 Department of Internal Medicine and Medical Therapy
 Department of Molecular Medicine
 Department of Public Health and Forensic Medicine
 Department of Neuroscience
 Department of Pharmacy
 Department of Biology and Biotechnology "Lazzaro Spallanzani"
 Department of Chemistry
 Department of Mathematics
 Department of Physics
 Department of Earth and Environmental Sciences
 Department of Civil Engineering and Architecture
 Department of Industrial and Information Engineering
 Department of Economics and Management
 Department of Law
 Department of Political and Social Sciences
 Department of Humanities
 Department of Musicology

Faculties 

 Faculty of Engineering
 Faculty of Medicine and Surgery

Campus 
The city of Pavia is essentially a city campus, so the campus buildings are located all around the city. The campuses for Faculty of Political Science and Law are located at Old Campus at Via Strada Nuova, near Pavia Cathedral. The campuses for Faculty of Engineering, Pharmacy, Mathematics, Physics and Natural Sciences are located at Via Ferrata, about 3 km away from the city center, in a building complex called Polo Cravino. The campuses for Faculty of Economics, Department of Psychology and Department of Philosophy are located at the Monastery of San Felice. The campus for Department of Musicology is located at Palazzo Raimondi, Cremona. The campuses for Faculty of Pharmacy and  Medicine and Surgery are located at Via Forlanini and Via Taramelli, near Policlinico San Matteo.

Palazzo Centrale 

The entrance to the Old Campus, which hosts the Faculty of Political Science and Law, is located at Via Strada Nuova. The palace has 9 courtyards — Cortile dei Caduti, Cortile di Volta, Cortile delle Statue, Cortile di Atilia Secundina, Cortile del Miliario, Cortile delle Magnolie, Cortile dei Tassi, Cortile Sforzesco, Cortile Teresiano. The palace also hosts more than 40 lecture theatres, including 8 lecture theatres for Faculty of Law and 10 lecture theatres for the Faculty of Political Science. The largest lecture theatre in the university is called Aula Magna, where inauguration ceremonies for graduations, white coat ceremonies and conferment of Medaglio Teresiana are held.

The palace dates back all the way to the 15th century. Originally, lessons by the university were held in private houses, in convents which provide suitable premises or in the same place as the municipal building. At the end of the 15th century, Ludovico il Moro assigned a building in Strada Nuova that belonged to Azzone Visconti to the university. Between 1661 and 1671, a major renovation was carried out under the guidance of the architect Ambrogio Pessina. During the 18th century, Maria Theresa of Austria wanted to make some improvements both to the education system and the building, thus she assigned the architect Giuseppe Piermarini and Leopoldo Pollack to oversee the renovations. Giuseppe Piermarini was in charge of the building facade and the courtyards, while Leopoldo Pollack was in charge of the lecture halls.

During the 19th century, the university also incorporated the former monastery of Leano, which was donated by Joseph II of Lorena Habsburg and expanded to Via Mentana, these works were entrusted to the architect Giuseppe Marchesi, who also constructed the Aula Magna.

In 1932, the university acquired a vast 15th century complex which belonged to San Matteo Hospital, thus completing its expansion. This complex now houses the Department of Molecular Medicine, which is in charge of the health courses.

Polo Cravino 
The land where Polo Cravino was built was purchased by the university at end of 1960. The complex was designed by an architect Giancarlo De Carlo. In 1980, the buildings for Faculty of Engineering, Department of Genetics, lecture halls, laboratories as well as a complex for Institute of Molecular Genetics, under the National Research Council were completed. In 1990, buildings for Department of Mathematics, Department of Earth and Environmental Science and a Computer Center were added.

Museums 

The university also manages multiple points of interest:

University History Museum 

The University History Museum hosts a large number of scientific instruments, anatomical and pathological preparations and samples, historical documents and volumes which are part of the university's history. The museum collection includes Antonio Scarpa's preserved dismembered head.

In addition to Scarpa's head, the museum also displays his kidneys and four of his fingers. Other anatomical samples include the aneurysm that killed mathematician Vincenzo Brunacci in 1818, the bladder of naturalist Lazzaro Spallanzani, who died of kidney cancer in 1799 as well as a plaster cast of Alessandro Volta's unusually large skull.

Museum of Electrical Technology 
The Museum of Electrical Technology is intended as a permanent tribute to Alessandro Volta. It has an area of 5,000 sqm, with 3,200 sqm reserved for visitors. It is divided into 5 sections, each section represents a different era of advancements in field of electricity and electronics.

The museum hosts over 4,000 pieces in its collections, including 300 pieces from the Enel collection, 3,028 pieces from the Sirti collection and over 1,000 pieces from the university's own collection. The collection contains devices such as radiotelephones, power supplies, amplifiers, horn loudspeakers, morse telegraphs, radio transmitters and receivers.

In 2017, the museum implemented a 3D tactile map for the blind and disabled. The museum also organizes exhibitions and projects with primary and secondary schools.

Museum of Natural History 

The Museum of Natural History dates back to 1769 when Lazzaro Spallanzani became professor on Natural History at the University of Pavia. The museum is divided into three sections — Comparative Anatomy, Zoology and Geopaleontology. The museum is currently located in Palazzo Botta Adorno.

The museum hosts multiple collections including:

 the Spallanzani collection which contains preserved specimens of the Nile crocodile (Crocodylus niloticus), hippopotamus (Hippopotamus amphibius), short-finned mako shark (Isurus oxyrhynchus), bottlenose dolphin (Tursiops truncatus), and small orangutan (Pongo pygmaeus).
 the Zoology collection which contains over 5,000 specimens of vertebrates and invertebrates.
 the Geopaleontology collection which contains over 30,000 fossil specimens, which date back the Piocene and Miocene era. The collections also includes 5,000 rocks and minerals and 65 slabs of fish from Bolca deposit.
 the Comparative Anatomy collection which contains more than 5,000 artifacts including skeletons, specimens and anatomical preparations of mainly vertebrates including an elephant, which underwent restoration in 2014.

Museum of Archeology 

The Museum of Archeology had its first collection funded by Pietro Vittorio Aldini in 1819 for education purposes. Now, it houses different collections such as engraved coins and gems from the late Roman empire, Celtic and Byzantine eras, potteries, figurines dating back to 2000 BC and a pair of mummies.

Museum Camillo Golgi 
The Museum Camillo Golgi was built in honor of Camillo Golgi and his most important discoveries, the black reaction to visualize neurons as well as his studies on malaria. The museum hosts a collection of his scientific publications and instruments used such as syringes, microtomes, microscopes, original photographic plates of histological preparations, all dating back to the 1900s. The museum was set in the same building where he conducted most of his experiments via the Institute of General Pathology.

Pavia Botanical Garden 

The Pavia Botanical Garden, which was established at the end of the 18th century, covers an area of 2 hectares. The botanical gardens host a seed and herbarium bank at its educational center, Bosco Siro Negri Park Reserve. The garden hosts a variety of plant collections including roses, orchids as well as other plant species native to Lombardy.

Museum of Mineralogy 
The Museum of Mineralogy originated from a section dedicated to minerals in the Museum of Natural History. The museum hosts a large collection of rocks and minerals, categorized systematically. The collection also includes minerals from different Italian regions. In 1923. Professor Angelo Bianchi donated rock samples which he had collected earlier in his career. Each sample was meticulously described in details in his various scientific publications.

The museum also displays a collection of meteorites which fell around Siena at the end of the 18th century and were collected by Lazzaro Spallanzani.

Center of Manuscripts 
The Center of Manuscripts ( or ) was formally established on 24 January 1980; however, in 1969, Maria Corti, a professor at the University of Pavia, had an idea to set up a Manuscript Fund, dedicated to preserving writings and manuscripts from twentieth-century authors. The center hosts a collection of writings and manuscripts from writers of the last two centuries including manuscripts and papers handwritten by the poet Eugenio Montale, as well as various autographed editions of the novel the Philosophy of Madonna by Carlo Emilio Gadda, and an annotated edition of the manuscript for My Cousin Andrea by Romano Bilenchi. The collection preserved by the center covers more than 200 authors.

The center is located at the Palazzo Centrale of the University of Pavia, and a branch is recently added to one of the university's sites at Via Luino.

Other collections 
The university also hosts special collections which are accessible only by appointments. These collections are not accessible by the public:

 Physiology collections covers 300 various instruments used in physiological research, such as galvanometers, scales, devices for measuring tactile sensation and pain sensitivity and so on. The collection is hosted by the Department of Molecular Medicine.
 Histology and embryology collections covers over 10,000 histological slides of different tissues and organs, embryological models in wax as well as microscopes and other instruments. The collection is hosted by the Department of Experimental Medicine.
 Musicology collections covers about 1,100 works including 80 musical instruments such as aerophones, chordophones and idiophones, as well as thousands of perforated rolls for antique pianos. The collection is hosted by the Department of Music.
 Cattaneo collection covers preserved anatomical and histological preparations in the fields of osteology, angiology, splanchnology, esthesiology, neurology and topographic anatomy. The collection is hosted by the Public Health, Neurosciences, Experimental and Forensic Medicine.

Academics
The university offers degree programmes in two languages:

Italian - Most of the courses in the University of Pavia are taught in Italian.
 English - One single-cycle master's degree, one undergraduate degree and seven master's degrees are offered in English. These degrees are:

 Three-year undergraduate degree in Artificial intelligence
 Six-year degree in Medicine and Surgery
 Master's degree in Molecular Biology and Genetics (MBG)
 Master's degree in Electronic Engineering
 Master's degree in Computer Engineering
 Master's degree in Industrial Automation Engineering
 Master's degree in International Business and Entrepreneurship (MIBE)
 Master's degree in Economics, Finance and International Integration (MEFI)
 Master's degree in World Politics and International Relations

Colleges 
The university has one of the most extensive colleges and residence halls in Italy, which house the majority of its students. These colleges are:

EDISU public colleges
EDISU Pavia is an agency established by the university in order to manage activities and services related to the right of study. It manages 4 refectories and 12 public colleges, which are:

 Collegio Fratelli Cairoli (male)
 Collegio Gerolamo Cardano (male and female) 
 Collegio Lazzaro Spallanzani (male)
 Collegio Lorenzo Valla (mixed)
 Collegio Castiglioni-Brugnatelli (female)
 Collegio Plinio Fraccaro (male) 
 Collegio Benvenuto Griziotti (male and female)
 Residenze Golgi I and II (male and female)

 Collegio Alessandro Volta (male and female)
 Collegio Giasone del Maino (male and female) 
 Collegio Universitario Quartier Novo

Private and public colleges 
 Collegio Borromeo (male and female)
 Collegio Ghislieri (male and female)
 Collegio Nuovo (female)
 Collegio Santa Caterina da Siena (female)

Notable alumni and academics

Honorary degrees

Medaglia teresiana

The Medaglia teresiana is an academic recognition that establishes the entry of a full professor in the University of Pavia. This award can also be conferred by the Rector of the University of Pavia to people who are particularly distinguished, traditionally hosted at the inauguration of the academic year or the day of the graduates:

See also 
 Policlinico San Matteo
 Coimbra Group (a network of leading European universities)
European University Association
 List of Italian universities
 List of medieval universities

References

External links
  University of Pavia Website
 

 
Pavia
Pavia, University of
Pavia, University of
Buildings and structures in Pavia
Education in Lombardy